The 2019 Oceania Shooting Championships took place from 3 to 8 November 2019, at Sydney International Shooting Centre, Sydney, Australia.

It acted as the Oceanian qualifying tournament for the 2020 Summer Olympics in Tokyo.

Medal summary

Men

Women

Medal table

References

External links
ISSF
ISSF Results

Oceania Shooting Championships
Oceania
Oceania Shooting Championships
Sports competitions in Sydney